Red-bodied swallowtails or  ruby swallowtail  ( due to the color ) are butterflies in the swallowtail family, that belong to the genera Atrophaneura, Byasa, Losaria, or Pachliopta. They are generally found in Asia (Indomalayan realm).

Collectors have found the red-bodied swallowtails difficult to kill. Pinching the thorax, a method which kills most butterflies, is withstood and apparently only stuns the butterfly temporarily.

Life history
The eggs are simple. The larvae resemble those of other Troidini. Fleshy spine-like tubercles, often with red tips, line the caterpillars' backs, and their bodies are dark red to brown and velvety black or shades of grey with a pattern of black lines. They feed on species of Aristolochia and Thottea. Chrysalids are camouflaged to look like a dead leaf or twig. They are attached by a girdle and an anal pad. Adults are nectar feeding.

Many species of red-bodied swallowtails show aposematism, and serve as models for Batesian mimicry. The biology of Pachliopta hector and Pachliopta aristolochiae are well studied.

Taxonomy
Species limits may be either narrow (many species - forma and subspecies raised to full or "good" species) or broad (fewer species - rank reduction) see Jürgen Haffer for a discussion.

Genera and species

Listed alphabetically within genera:

genus: Atrophaneura Reakirt, [1865] (earlier considered as subgenus Atrophaneura but now raised to genus level)
Atrophaneura aidoneus (Doubleday, 1845) — lesser batwing
Atrophaneura dixoni (Grose-Smith, 1900)
Atrophaneura horishana (Matsumura, 1910) — aurora swallowtail
Atrophaneura kuehni (Honrath, 1886) 
Atrophaneura luchti (Roepke, 1935) 
Atrophaneura nox (Swainson, 1822) — Malayan batwing
Atrophaneura priapus (Boisduval, 1836) — Priapus batwing
Atrophaneura semperi (C. & R. Felder, 1861)
Atrophaneura schadenbergi (Semper, 1891)
Atrophaneura sycorax (Grose-Smith, 1885)
Atrophaneura varuna (White, 1842) — common batwing
Atrophaneura zaleucus (Hewitson, [1865])

genus: Byasa Moore, 1882 (earlier considered as subgenus Byasa but now raised to genus level)
Byasa adamsoni (Grose-Smith, 1886) — Adamson's rose
Byasa alcinous (Klug, 1836) — Chinese windmill
Byasa crassipes (Oberthür, 1893) — black windmill
Byasa daemonius (Alphéraky, 1895)
Byasa dasarada (Moore, 1857) — great windmill
Byasa hedistus (Jordan, 1928)
Byasa impediens (Rothschild, 1895)
Byasa laos (Riley & Godfrey, 1921)
Byasa latreillei (Donovan, 1826) — rose windmill
Byasa mencius (C. & R. Felder, 1862)
Byasa nevilli (Wood-Mason, 1882) — Nevill's windmill
Byasa plutonius (Oberthür, 1876) — Chinese windmill
Byasa polla (de Nicéville, 1897) — De Niceville's windmill
Byasa polyeuctes (Doubleday, 1842) — common windmill
Byasa rhadinus (Jordan, 1928)

genus: Losaria Moore, [1902] (earlier considered as subgenus Losaria but now raised to genus level)
Losaria coon (Fabricius, 1793) — common clubtail
Losaria palu (Martin, 1912) — Palu swallowtail - has been regarded a subspecies of A. coon
Losaria rhodifer (Butler, 1876) — Andaman clubtail
Losaria neptunus (Guérin-Méneville, 1840) — yellow-bodied club-tail or yellow club-tail

genus: Pachliopta Reakirt, [1865] (earlier considered as subgenus Pachliopta but now raised to genus level)
Pachliopta adamas (Zinken, 1831)
Pachliopta aristolochiae (Fabricius, 1775) — common rose
Pachliopta antiphus (Fabricius, 1793)
Pachliopta atropos (Staudinger, 1888)
Pachliopta hector (Linnaeus, 1758) — crimson rose
Pachliopta jophon (Gray, [1853]) — Ceylon rose or Sri Lankan rose
Pachliopta kotzebuea (Eschscholtz, 1821) — pink rose
Pachliopta leytensis (Murayama, 1978)
Pachliopta liris (Godart, 1819)
Pachliopta mariae (Semper, 1878)
Pachliopta oreon (Doherty, 1891)
Pachliopta pandiyana (Moore, 1881) — Malabar rose
Pachliopta phlegon (C. & R. Felder, 1864)
Pachliopta polydorus (Linnaeus, 1763) — red-bodied swallowtail
Pachliopta polyphontes (Boisduval, 1836)
Pachliopta strandi (Bryk, 1930)

References

External links

Flickr Correctly identified tagged photos
Atrophaneura at Butterflycorner.net
Pteron

Atrophaneura
Insect common names
Taxobox binomials not recognized by IUCN